Polites vibex, or the whirlabout, is a grass skipper in the family Hesperiidae. The whirlabout gets its name from the landing and take off flight patterns of the adult – a circular or vortex or whirling motion. It is resident from the southeastern U.S. and West Indies to eastern Mexico through the tropics down to Argentina. During the warmer North American months, it can sometimes be found as far north as Ohio, Connecticut, and northeast Iowa.
 
North of the equator, it flies all year and migrates north in late summer and fall.

The larvae feed on grasses mainly at night. Eggs are white and laid one at a time on the host plants.

Description
The whirlabout exhibits sexual dimorphism. Both have elongated wings but the male is orange and yellow and the female is dark brown.

Male
From above, the forewing is orange with a black stigma and nearby scales that form a dark, four-sided patch. The forewing also has a jagged black border. The hindwing has a black margin that is smooth inwardly.

From below, the hindwing is golden orange with large, dark, smudged spots.

Female
From above, the forewing is dark brown with light colored spots. From below, the hindwing is a greyish yellow-brown with a couple of bands of large brown spots and light central patch with dark scales at edges.

Geographic range
The whirlabout butterfly is resident from the southeastern U.S. and West Indies to eastern Mexico through the tropics down to Argentina. During the warmer months it can sometimes be found as far north as Ohio, Connecticut, and northeast Iowa.

Habitat
Coastal plain grassy areas, fields, dunes, pinewoods, roadsides, disturbed areas, vacant lots, open woodlots, forest edges, parks, lawns, and gardens.

Food resources
Caterpillars eat various grasses. Adults eat the nectar of flowers.

References

External links
Whirlabout, Butterflies and Moths of North America

Butterflies of North America
Hesperiini
Polites (butterfly)
Butterflies of Trinidad and Tobago